A defensive coordinator is a coach responsible for a gridiron football (American football) team's defense. Generally, the defensive coordinator, the offensive coordinator and the special teams coordinator represent the second level of a team's coaching structure, with the head coach being the first level. The primary role of the defensive coordinator is managing the roster of defensive players, overseeing the assistant coaches, developing the defensive game plan, and calling plays for the defense during the game. The defensive coordinator typically manages multiple position coaches, each of whom are responsible for various defensive positions on the team (such as the defensive line, linebackers, or defensive backs).

While the job of defensive coordinator is largely similar at the collegiate and professional level, college coaches are more involved in the recruitment process. A successful defensive coordinator is often a stepping stone to the position of head coach.

Other major sports with strong delineation between offensive and defensive positions use similar coaching positions. For example: Phil Housley served as a defensive coordinator for the National Hockey League's Nashville Predators from 2013 to 2017 and currently fills the same role with the Arizona Coyotes.

See also
 List of current National Football League defensive coordinators
 :Category:National Football League defensive coordinators

References

Further reading

 
 
 

American football occupations
Defensive coordinator